The 1998 Bedford Borough Council election took place on 7 May 1998 to elect members of Bedford Borough Council in Bedfordshire, England. One third of the council was up for election and the council stayed under no overall control.

Prior to the election, two councillors left the Liberal Democrats group to sit as Independents.

Summary

Election result

Ward results

Brickhill

Castle

Cauldwell

De Parys

Felmersham

Goldington

Harpur

Harrold

Kempston East

Kempston West

Kingsbrook

Newnham

Oakley

Putnoe

Queens Park

Renhold

Riseley

Wilhamstead

References

1998
Bedford Borough Council
Bedford Borough Council 1998